The 1901 William & Mary Orange and White football team represented William & Mary during the 1901 college football season.

Schedule

References

William and Mary
William & Mary Tribe football seasons
William